Amedeo Marchi (born 8 February 1889, date of death unknown) was an Italian gymnast who competed in the 1908 Summer Olympics. In 1908 he finished sixth with the Italian team in the team competition.

References

External links
 

Year of death missing
1889 births
Italian male artistic gymnasts
Olympic gymnasts of Italy
Gymnasts at the 1908 Summer Olympics